Kamrup may refer to:

 associated with Kamarupa (350–1140), an early state during the Classical period on the Indian subcontinent, the first historical kingdom of Assam
 Kamrup region, a region in Lower Assam, India between the Manas and Barnadi rivers
 Kamrup district, or Kamrup rural district, an administrative district
 Kamrup Metropolitan district, an administrative district
 Undivided Kamrup district, a former administrative district

See also
 Kamrupi (disambiguation)
 Kamarupa Pithas, ancient geographical divisions of Kamrupa
 Kamarupa – Late to end period, Kamarupa kingdom from mid-seventh to twelfth-century (covering the Mlechchha and the Pala (Kamarupa) dynasty
 Cultural development of Kamarupa
 Kamarupa Anusandhan Samiti, a research society on ancient Kamrup studies
 Greater Kamrup, the historical extent of the political boundaries and culture of Kamrup beyond the current cultural sphere
 Kamrup Ki Kahani, television serial
 Kamrup Express, a daily express train